13th SFFCC Awards
December 14, 2014

Best Picture: 
 Boyhood 

The 13th San Francisco Film Critics Circle Awards, honoring the best in film for 2014, were given on December 14, 2014.

Winners

Best Picture
Boyhood
Birdman
The Imitation Game
Under the Skin
Whiplash

Best Director
Richard Linklater – Boyhood
Wes Anderson – The Grand Budapest Hotel
Jonathan Glazer – Under the Skin
Alejandro G. Iñárritu – Birdman
Mike Leigh – Mr. Turner

Best Actor
Michael Keaton – Birdman
Benedict Cumberbatch – The Imitation Game
Jake Gyllenhaal – Nightcrawler
Eddie Redmayne – The Theory of Everything
Timothy Spall – Mr. Turner

Best Actress
Julianne Moore – Still Alice
Marion Cotillard – Two Days, One Night
Essie Davis – The Babadook
Scarlett Johansson – Under the Skin
Reese Witherspoon – Wild

Best Supporting Actor
Edward Norton – Birdman
Ethan Hawke – Boyhood
Gene Jones – The Sacrament
Mark Ruffalo – Foxcatcher
J. K. Simmons – Whiplash

Best Supporting Actress
Patricia Arquette – Boyhood
Jessica Chastain – A Most Violent Year
Agata Kulesza – Ida
Emma Stone – Birdman
Tilda Swinton – Snowpiercer

Best Original Screenplay
Birdman – Alejandro G. Iñárritu, Nicolás Giacobone, Alexander Dinelaris Jr., and Armando BoBoyhood – Richard Linklater
The Grand Budapest Hotel – Wes Anderson and Hugo Guinness
A Most Violent Year – J. C. Chandor
Mr. Turner – Mike Leigh
Whiplash – Damien Chazelle

Best Adapted ScreenplayInherent Vice – Paul Thomas AndersonGone Girl – Gillian Flynn
The Imitation Game – Graham Moore
Snowpiercer – Bong Joon-ho and Kelly Masterson
Wild – Nick Hornby

Best CinematographyIda – Łukasz Żal and Ryszard LenczewskiBirdman – Emmanuel Lubezki
The Grand Budapest Hotel – Robert Yeoman
Mr. Turner – Dick Pope
Under the Skin – Daniel Landin

Best Production DesignThe Grand Budapest Hotel – Adam StockhausenBirdman – Kevin Thompson
Inherent Vice – David Crank
Mr. Turner – Suzie Davies
Snowpiercer – Ondrej Nekvasil

Best EditingBoyhood – Sandra AdairBirdman – Douglas Crise and Stephen Mirrione
Inherent Vice – Leslie Jones
Under the Skin – Paul Watts
Whiplash – Tom Cross

Best Animated FeatureThe Lego Movie
Big Hero 6
The Boxtrolls
How to Train Your Dragon 2
The Tale of the Princess Kaguya

Best Foreign Language Picture
Ida – Poland / DenmarkA Girl Walks Home Alone at Night – Iran
Force Majeure – Sweden
Two Days, One Night – Belgium
Wild Tales – Argentina

Best DocumentaryCitizenfour
Finding Vivian Maier
Jodorowsky's Dune
Life Itself
The Overnighters

Marlon Riggs Award for courage & vision in the Bay Area film community
Joel Shepard

Special Citation for under-appreciated independent cinema
The One I Love

References

External links
The San Francisco Film Critics Circle
2014 San Francisco Film Critics Circle Awards

San Francisco Film Critics Circle Awards
2014 film awards